Pure Therapy is the debut album by avant-garde metal band Ram-Zet released on April 30, 2000 under the Finnish record label Spikefarm Records. The band produced the album by themselves.

Pure Therapy starts the schizophrenia theme, continued in the following two releases Escape (2002) and Intra (2005), with a unique story about this mental disorder in two main characters.

Track listing
 "The Fall" - 4:37
 "King" - 5:59
 "For The Sake Of Mankind" - 5:59
 "Eternal Voice/Peace?" -  8:50
 "No Peace" - 7:38
 "Kill My Thoughts" - 5:08
 "Sense" - 5:17
 "Through The Eyes Of The Children" - 6:41

Personnel

Ram-Zet
 Miriam Elisabeth "Sfinx" Renvåg - lead vocals
 Kent "Kiith" Frydenlund - drums
 Henning "Zet" Ramseth - lead vocals, guitar, keyboards, stuff, lyrics
 Kjell Solem - bass

Additional musicians
 Aud Ingebjørg Barstad - violin
 Sissel Strømbu, Randi Strømbu, Anne Linne Staxrud - female vocals
 Mie Kristine Storbekken Lindstad - lyrics

Production
 Ram-Zet - arrangements, producing, engineering
 Space Valley Studios - recording studio
 Mikko Karmilla at Finnvox Studios - mixing
 Mika Jussila at Finnvox Studios - mastering

Artwork
 Torel Larsen - photography
 Lars E Nordrum  - photography
 Tore L. Larsen - cover art

References

External links 
Metallum Archives
Discogs.com

2000 debut albums
Ram-Zet albums
Century Media Records albums
Spinefarm Records albums
Concept albums